Reece Daniel Thompson (born 22 November 1988) is a Canadian actor. Thompson started his acting career as a child actor by voice acting in several animated television series and minor roles on television shows before transitioning to films. His first major role came in the 2007 film Rocket Science. Thompson appeared in 2009's Assassination of a High School President and Afterwards. He appeared as Craig in The Perks of Being a Wallflower (2012).

Early life
Thompson grew up in a small town near Vancouver. Thompson had always expressed an interest in becoming an actor to his parents and at a young age, Thompson, along with the rest of his family, began taking background roles in productions in Vancouver.

After the sixth grade, Thompson decided that he didn't want to continue going to school and convinced his mother to homeschool him. Soon after Thompson began attending an acting school. Thompson signed with an agent he was introduced to through the school and began attending auditions.

Career
Thompson began his acting career with voice acting roles on animated television series and made small appearances in a few television series. He provided voices on Infinite Ryvius, MegaMan NT Warrior, InuYasha and Master Keaton. Thompson appeared in episodes of Jeremiah, Tru Calling and the mini-series Living With the Dead. His first major live-action television role came in 2002 when he played the character James Barns on Canadian children's television series I Love Mummy.

Thompson made his first film appearance with a small role in the 2003 film Dreamcatcher. In 2004, Thompson played the character of Jinto in three episodes of the science fiction television series Stargate Atlantis. Thompson also had small film roles in 2004's Superbabies: Baby Geniuses 2 and 2005's The Sandlot 2. In 2005, Thompson provided the voice for the character Simon Star in the animated television series Trollz. That same year, Thompson got a recurring role in the Canadian children's television series Zixx as Dwayne, one of the new main characters introduced in the show's second season. In 2008, Thompson reprised the role in the third season of the series. In 2006, Thompson made a guest appearance on an episode of Smallville and had a recurring role in the short-lived ABC Family series Three Moons Over Milford.

Thompson landed his first major film role as Hal Hefner, the protagonist in 2007's Rocket Science, a coming of age film about a stuttering boy who joins the high school debate team. The film was well-received, earning a Grand Jury Prize nomination at the Sundance Film Festival. Along with this, he started acting as Aero in the Geotrax animated series during this time.

Thompson's next film, Assassination of a High School President, was released straight to DVD on 6 October 2009. 
Along with this, he stars in the last Geotrax episode, "Steamer and Samuel save the day", which was released along with the 3 other Geotrax episodes on DVD. Thompson is also featured in Afterwards, a French-Canadian film production released in Europe in 2009.

In 2010, Thompson played a small-town stoner in Daydream Nation. That same year, Thompson appeared as the sensitive Marshall in Ceremony. In 2011, Thompson featured in the film Bloodworth.

In 2012, Thompson appeared in the film The Perks of Being a Wallflower, based on the popular novel of the same name.

Personal life
He currently lives part-time in Vancouver, British Columbia, Canada. The other half of his time is spent living in Los Angeles, California. He is a co-founder of the online comedy group "Jitterbug Productions".

Filmography

References

External links
 
 Jitterbug Productions website

1988 births
Living people
Canadian male child actors
Canadian male film actors
Canadian male television actors
Canadian male voice actors
People from White Rock, British Columbia
21st-century Canadian male actors